Bolshaya Anikovskaya is a rural locality (a village) in Cherdynsky District, Perm Krai, Russia. The population was 59 as of 2010. There are 2 streets.

Geography 
Bolshaya Anikovskaya is located 25 km south of Cherdyn (the district's administrative centre) by road. Baydary is the nearest rural locality.

References 

Rural localities in Cherdynsky District